This is a list of 308 species in Valenzuela, a genus of lizard barklice in the family Caeciliusidae.

Valenzuela species

 Valenzuela abiectus (Costa, 1885) c g
 Valenzuela adrianae (Mockford, 1991) c g
 Valenzuela albiceps (Pearman, J. V., 1934) c g
 Valenzuela albimaculatus (Badonnel, 1967) c g
 Valenzuela albipes (Thornton, 1984) c g
 Valenzuela albofasciatus (Mockford, 1991) c g
 Valenzuela albomarginatus (Enderlein, 1910) c g
 Valenzuela albus (Badonnel, 1987) c g
 Valenzuela alcinus (Banks, N., 1941) c g
 Valenzuela alticola (Vaughan, Thornton & New, 1991) c g
 Valenzuela ambiguus (Pearman, J. V., 1932) c g
 Valenzuela amicus (Kolbe, 1885) c g
 Valenzuela andeanus (New & Thornton, 1975) c g
 Valenzuela andinus (Cole, New & Thornton, 1989) c g
 Valenzuela angustiplumalus (Li, Fasheng, 1995) c g
 Valenzuela ankaratrensis (Badonnel, 1967) c g
 Valenzuela annulicornis (Enderlein, 1903) c g
 Valenzuela anomalus (Badonnel, 1959) c g
 Valenzuela apicatus (Thornton, S. S. Lee & Chui, 1972) c g
 Valenzuela aridus (Hagen, 1858) c g
 Valenzuela astovensis (New, 1977) c g
 Valenzuela atricornis (McLachlan, 1869) i c g
 Valenzuela badiostigma (Okamoto, 1910) c g
 Valenzuela baishanzuicus (Li, Fasheng, 1995) c g
 Valenzuela baliensis (Thornton, 1984) c g
 Valenzuela bambusae (Soehardjan & Hamann, 1959) c g
 Valenzuela bataviensis (Enderlein, 1926) c g
 Valenzuela bengalensis (Badonnel, 1981) c g
 Valenzuela bermudensis (Mockford, 1989) c g
 Valenzuela bicolorinervus (Li, Fasheng, 1993) c g
 Valenzuela bicoloripes (Badonnel, 1969) c g
 Valenzuela bicolorus (Li, Fasheng, 1993) c g
 Valenzuela bifoliolatus (Li, Fasheng, 1993) c g
 Valenzuela biminiensis (Mockford, 1969) c g
 Valenzuela boggianii (Ribaga, 1908) c g
 Valenzuela bombensis (Baz, 1990) c g
 Valenzuela boreus (Mockford, 1965) i c g b
 Valenzuela borneensis (Karny, H. H., 1925) c g
 Valenzuela brunneimaculatus (Li, Fasheng, 1993) c g
 Valenzuela brunneoflavus (Badonnel, 1935) c g
 Valenzuela brunneonitens (Pearman, J. V., 1932) c g
 Valenzuela burmeisteri (Brauer, 1876) i c g
 Valenzuela cabrerai (Navas, 1920) c g
 Valenzuela caligonoides (Mockford, 1969) c g
 Valenzuela caligonus (Banks, N., 1941) c g
 Valenzuela caloclypeus (Mockford and Gurney, 1956) i c g
 Valenzuela canei (Williner, 1944) c g
 Valenzuela capelli (Navás, 1914) c g
 Valenzuela caribensis (Mockford, 1969) c g
 Valenzuela carneangularis (Li, Fasheng, 1997) c g
 Valenzuela carrilloi (New & Thornton, 1981) c g
 Valenzuela castellus (Banks, N., 1916) c g
 Valenzuela chilozonus (Li, Fasheng, 1995) c g
 Valenzuela chrysopterus (Li, Fasheng, 1997) c g
 Valenzuela cinalus (New & Thornton, 1975) c g
 Valenzuela cincticornis (Banks, N., 1920) c g
 Valenzuela citrinus (Li, Fasheng, 1995) c g
 Valenzuela claripennis (Mockford, 1991) c g
 Valenzuela claristigma (New & Thornton, 1975) c g
 Valenzuela clarivenus (Vaughan, Thornton & New, 1991) c g
 Valenzuela clayae (New & Thornton, 1975) c g
 Valenzuela coei (New, 1973) c g
 Valenzuela collarti (Badonnel, 1946) c g
 Valenzuela columbianus (Badonnel, 1986) c g
 Valenzuela complexus (Turner, B. D., 1975) c g
 Valenzuela confluens (Walsh, 1863) i c g b
 Valenzuela conspicuus (Banks, N., 1937) c g
 Valenzuela cornutus (Navás, 1915) c g
 Valenzuela corsicus (Kolbe, 1882) c g
 Valenzuela croesus (Chapman, 1930) i c g b
 Valenzuela cuboideus (Li, Fasheng, 1995) c g
 Valenzuela cuspidatus (Li, Fasheng, 1997) c g
 Valenzuela cyrtospilus (Li, Fasheng, 1999) c g
 Valenzuela dayongicus (Li, Fasheng, 1992) c g
 Valenzuela debilis (Pictet-Baraban & Hagen, 1856) c g
 Valenzuela deceptor (Banks, N., 1920) c g
 Valenzuela delamarei (Badonnel, 1949) c g
 Valenzuela delicatulus (Li, Fasheng, 1992) c g
 Valenzuela descolei (Williner, 1944) c g
 Valenzuela despaxi (Badonnel, 1936) c g
 Valenzuela dicornis (Li, Fasheng, 1997) c g
 Valenzuela dificilis (Mockford, 1969) c g
 Valenzuela dinghuensis (New, 1991) c g
 Valenzuela diploideus (Li, Fasheng, 1999) c g
 Valenzuela distinctus (Mockford, 1966) i c g
 Valenzuela dives (Navas, 1927) c g
 Valenzuela dolichostigmus (Li, Fasheng, 1992) c g
 Valenzuela dubius (Badonnel, 1946) c g
 Valenzuela eastopi (New & Thornton, 1975) c g
 Valenzuela elegans (Mockford, 1969) c g
 Valenzuela elegantoides (Mockford, 1969) c g
 Valenzuela equivocatus (Mockford, 1969) c g
 Valenzuela erythrostigma (Li, Fasheng, 1993) c
 Valenzuela erythrostigmus Li, Fasheng, 2002 c g
 Valenzuela erythrozonalis (Li, Fasheng, 1993) c g
 Valenzuela estriatus (Li, Fasheng, 1997) c g
 Valenzuela excavatus (Li, Fasheng, 1993) c g
 Valenzuela farrelli (Cole, New & Thornton, 1989) c g
 Valenzuela fasciatus (Enderlein, 1906) c g
 Valenzuela fasciipennis (Mockford, 1969) c g
 Valenzuela flavibrunneus (Mockford, 1969) c g
 Valenzuela flavidorsalis (Okamoto, 1910) c g
 Valenzuela flavidus (Stephens, 1836) i c g b
 Valenzuela flavipennis (Costa, 1885) c g
 Valenzuela flavistigma (Tillyard, 1923) c g
 Valenzuela flavus (Smithers, Courtenay, 1969) c g
 Valenzuela florinaevus (Li, Fasheng, 1999) c g
 Valenzuela foramilulosus (Li, Fasheng, 1995) c g
 Valenzuela fortis (Li, Fasheng, 1995) c g
 Valenzuela fortunatus (Enderlein, 1929) c g
 Valenzuela fraternus (Banks, N., 1937) c g
 Valenzuela fuligineneurus (Li, Fasheng, 1997) c g
 Valenzuela furculatus (Navás, 1934) c g
 Valenzuela fuscipennis (Thornton, S. S. Lee & Chui, 1972) c g
 Valenzuela fuscolineus (Turner, B. D. & Cheke, 1983) c g
 Valenzuela fusicangularis (Li, Fasheng, 1995) c g
 Valenzuela gelaberti (Navás, 1914) c g
 Valenzuela gemmatus (Mockford, 1991) c g
 Valenzuela ghesquierei (Badonnel, 1946) c g
 Valenzuela gonostigma (Enderlein, 1906) i c g b
 Valenzuela gracilentus (Li, Fasheng, 1997) c g
 Valenzuela gracilis (Okamoto, 1910) c g
 Valenzuela graminis (Mockford, 1966) i c g
 Valenzuela grandivalvus (Li, Fasheng, 1999) c g
 Valenzuela granulosus (Badonnel, 1967) c g
 Valenzuela gutianshanicus (Li, Fasheng, 1995) c g
 Valenzuela gynapterus (Tetens, 1891) c g
 Valenzuela hainanensis (New, 1991) c g
 Valenzuela hemipsocoides (Badonnel, 1935) c g
 Valenzuela heptimacularus (Li, Fasheng, 1999) c g
 Valenzuela himalayanus (Enderlein, 1903) c g
 Valenzuela hivesi (Cole, New & Thornton, 1989) c g
 Valenzuela huangi (Li, Fasheng, 1999) c g
 Valenzuela hubeiensis (Li, Fasheng, 1997) c g
 Valenzuela hyperboreus (Mockford, 1965) i c g b
 Valenzuela ilamensis (New, 1983) c g
 Valenzuela imbecillus (McLachlan, 1866) c g
 Valenzuela imitator (Badonnel, 1969) c g
 Valenzuela impressus (Hagen, 1859) c g
 Valenzuela incoloratus (Mockford, 1969) i c g
 Valenzuela incurviusculus (Li, Fasheng, 1995) c g
 Valenzuela indicator (Mockford, 1969) i c g b
 Valenzuela indicus (Navás, 1934) c g
 Valenzuela inornatus (Mockford, 1996) c g
 Valenzuela inquinatus (Enderlein, 1902) c g
 Valenzuela insidiosus (Badonnel, 1967) c g
 Valenzuela isochasialis (Li, Fasheng, 1995) c g
 Valenzuela itremoensis (Badonnel, 1976) c g
 Valenzuela jamaicensis (Banks, N., 1938) c g
 Valenzuela javanus (Enderlein, 1907) c g
 Valenzuela juniperorum (Mockford, 1969) i c g
 Valenzuela kamakurensis (Okamoto, 1910) c g
 Valenzuela kamatembanus (Badonnel, 1959) c g
 Valenzuela kansuensis (Enderlein, 1934) c g
 Valenzuela klebsi (Enderlein, 1911) c g
 Valenzuela kraussi (Thornton, S. S. Lee & Chui, 1972) c g
 Valenzuela kunashirensis Mockford, 2003 c g
 Valenzuela labinae Lienhard, 2006 c g
 Valenzuela labratus (Navás, 1934) c g
 Valenzuela labrostylus Lienhard, 2002 c g
 Valenzuela lachloosae  b
 Valenzuela lemniscellus (Enderlein, 1907) c g
 Valenzuela leuroceps (Thornton, S. S. Lee & Chui, 1972) c g
 Valenzuela lochloosae (Mockford, 1965) i c g
 Valenzuela longistylus (Badonnel, 1935) c g
 Valenzuela longulus (Navás, 1932) c g
 Valenzuela luachimensis (Badonnel, 1955) c g
 Valenzuela luridus (Enderlein, 1903) c g
 Valenzuela luteovenosus (Okamoto, 1910) c g
 Valenzuela machadoi (Badonnel, 1955) c g
 Valenzuela macromelaus (Li, Fasheng, 1993) c g
 Valenzuela maculistigma (Enderlein, 1903) c g
 Valenzuela magnioculus (Li, Fasheng, 1991) c g
 Valenzuela manteri (Sommerman, 1943) i c g b
 Valenzuela manteri (Sommerman, 1943) i c g b
 Valenzuela marginalis (Badonnel, 1955) c g
 Valenzuela marginatus (Thornton, S. S. Lee & Chui, 1972) c g
 Valenzuela marginilacutus (Li, Fasheng, 1999) c g
 Valenzuela maritimus (Mockford, 1965) i c g
 Valenzuela mclareni (Cole, New & Thornton, 1989) c g
 Valenzuela medialunatus (Vaughan, Thornton & New, 1991) c g
 Valenzuela medimacularis (Li, Fasheng, 1997) c g
 Valenzuela megalocystis (Li, Fasheng, 1995) c g
 Valenzuela megalodichotomus (Li, Fasheng, 1997) c g
 Valenzuela melanocnemis (Enderlein, 1907) c g
 Valenzuela metasequoiae (Li, Fasheng, 1997) c g
 Valenzuela mexcalensis (Mockford, 1965) c g
 Valenzuela mexicanus (Enderlein, 1909) c g
 Valenzuela micanopi (Mockford, 1965) i c g b
 Valenzuela micans (New & Thornton, 1975) c g
 Valenzuela microcystus (Li, Fasheng, 1995) c g
 Valenzuela milloti (Badonnel, 1967) c g
 Valenzuela minutoculus (Li, Fasheng, 1991) c g
 Valenzuela miocensis (Baz, 1990) c g
 Valenzuela mjoebergi (Karny, H. H., 1925) c g
 Valenzuela mockfordi (Turner, B. D., 1975) c g
 Valenzuela mueggenbergi (Enderlein, 1903) g
 Valenzuela mueggenburgi (Enderlein, 1903) c g
 Valenzuela multimaculatus (Li, Fasheng, 1991) c g
 Valenzuela myrmicaformis (Turner, B. D., 1975) c g
 Valenzuela nadleri (Mockford, 1966) i c g b
 Valenzuela nebuloides Mockford, 2000 c g
 Valenzuela nebulomaculatus Mockford, 2000 c g
 Valenzuela nebulosoides Mockford, 2000 c g
 Valenzuela nebulosus (Navás, 1909) c g
 Valenzuela nigricornis (Okamoto, 1910) c g
 Valenzuela nigritibia (Yoshizawa, 1997) c g
 Valenzuela nigroticta (Williner, 1945) c g
 Valenzuela obliquus (Li, Fasheng, 1992) c g
 Valenzuela obscuripennis (Mockford, 1991) c g
 Valenzuela obscurus (Pearman, J. V., 1932) c g
 Valenzuela ochroleucus (Li, Fasheng, 1993) c g
 Valenzuela oculatus (Kolbe, 1884) c g
 Valenzuela okamotoi (Banks, N., 1937) c g
 Valenzuela olitorius (Banks, N., 1941) c g
 Valenzuela oyamai (Enderlein, 1906) c g
 Valenzuela pakistanensis (Badonnel, 1981) c g
 Valenzuela pallidobrunneus (Mockford, 1969) c g
 Valenzuela paradistinctus (New & Thornton, 1975) c g
 Valenzuela paraguayensis (Enderlein, 1910) c g
 Valenzuela paramonus (Badonnel, 1986) c g
 Valenzuela parbatensis (New, 1983) c g
 Valenzuela patellaris (Li, Fasheng, 1992) c g
 Valenzuela pauliani (Badonnel, 1967) c g
 Valenzuela pectinatus (Badonnel, 1955) c g
 Valenzuela pelmus (New & Thornton, 1976) c g
 Valenzuela perplexus (Chapman, 1930) i c g b
 Valenzuela peyrierasi (Badonnel, 1976) c g
 Valenzuela phaeocephalus (Li, Fasheng, 1995) c g
 Valenzuela phaeopterellus Mockford, 2003 c g
 Valenzuela phaeopterus (Li, Fasheng, 1997) c g
 Valenzuela phaeozanalis (Li, Fasheng, 1995) c g
 Valenzuela piceus (Kolbe, 1882) c g
 Valenzuela pinicola (Banks, 1903) i c g b
 Valenzuela plagioerythrinus (Li, Fasheng, 1993) c g
 Valenzuela platytaenius (Li, Fasheng, 1995) c g
 Valenzuela podacromelas (Enderlein, 1908) c g
 Valenzuela podacrophaeus (Enderlein, 1909) c g
 Valenzuela posticoides (Mockford, 1991) c g
 Valenzuela posticus (Banks, 1914) i c g b
 Valenzuela proavus (Pictet-Baraban & Hagen, 1856) c g
 Valenzuela prometheus (Enderlein, 1911) c g
 Valenzuela protritus (Enderlein, 1931) c g
 Valenzuela pseudanalis (Thornton, S. S. Lee & Chui, 1972) c g
 Valenzuela pteridii (Smithers, Courtenay, 1977) c g
 Valenzuela pubes (Enderlein, 1903) c g
 Valenzuela pugioniformis (Li, Fasheng, 1995) c g
 Valenzuela pulchellus (Mockford, 1974) c g
 Valenzuela purpureus (Li, Fasheng, 1993) c g
 Valenzuela pycnacanthus (Li, Fasheng, 1997) c g
 Valenzuela quadrimaculatus (Li, Fasheng, 1993) c g
 Valenzuela quaternatus (Li, Fasheng, 1993) c g
 Valenzuela quinarius (Li, Fasheng, 1993) c g
 Valenzuela rodriguezi (Williner, 1944) c g
 Valenzuela roseus (New, 1971) c g
 Valenzuela rosor (Navás, 1930) c g
 Valenzuela rubinii (Vaughan, Thornton & New, 1991) c g
 Valenzuela rubiventer (Thornton, 1984) c g
 Valenzuela sanchezlabradori (Williner, 1949) c g
 Valenzuela scenepipedus (Enderlein, 1911) c g
 Valenzuela scriptus (Enderlein, 1906) c g
 Valenzuela serpentinus (Enderlein, 1926) c g
 Valenzuela shixingensis (Li, Fasheng, 1993) c g
 Valenzuela signatipennis (Enderlein, 1907) c g
 Valenzuela similipennis (Badonnel, 1967) c g
 Valenzuela similis (Badonnel, 1949) c g
 Valenzuela simplex (Navás, 1930) c g
 Valenzuela singularis (Smithers, Courtenay, 1995) c g
 Valenzuela sinuofasciatus (Badonnel, 1935) c g
 Valenzuela soleili (Badonnel, 1946) c g
 Valenzuela spiloerythrinus (Li, Fasheng, 1993) c g
 Valenzuela spissicornis (Badonnel, 1943) c g
 Valenzuela stenopterus (Li, Fasheng, 1993) c g
 Valenzuela stigmatus (Okamoto, 1910) c g
 Valenzuela striolatus (Li, Fasheng, 1995) c g
 Valenzuela stuckenbergi (Badonnel, 1967) c g
 Valenzuela subelegans (Mockford, 1969) c g
 Valenzuela subflavus (Aaron, 1886) i c g b
 Valenzuela sublineatus Mockford, 2000 c g
 Valenzuela subnebulosus Mockford, 2000 c g
 Valenzuela subundulatus (Li, Fasheng, 1995) c g
 Valenzuela sucinicaptus (Enderlein, 1911) c g
 Valenzuela suffusus (Navás, 1931) c g
 Valenzuela sulciformis (Li, Fasheng, 1992) c g
 Valenzuela tamiami (Mockford, 1965) i c g
 Valenzuela thiemei (Enderlein, 1903) c g
 Valenzuela totonacus (Mockford, 1966) i c g
 Valenzuela traceus (Thornton, 1984) c g
 Valenzuela trifolius (Li, Fasheng, 1999) c g
 Valenzuela trigonostigma (Enderlein, 1907) c g
 Valenzuela trigonus (Li, Fasheng, 1997) c g
 Valenzuela trimaculatus (Li, Fasheng, 1992) c g
 Valenzuela trukensis (Thornton, S. S. Lee & Chui, 1972) c g
 Valenzuela tuberculatus (New & Thornton, 1975) c g
 Valenzuela umbratus (Navas, 1922) c g
 Valenzuela umbripennis (Navás, 1932) c g
 Valenzuela vau (Enderlein, 1931) c g
 Valenzuela velectus (Thornton, 1984) c g
 Valenzuela veracruzensis (Mockford, 1969) c g
 Valenzuela villiersi (Badonnel, 1943) c g
 Valenzuela virgatus (Broadhead & Alison Richards, 1982) c g
 Valenzuela vitellinus (Li, Fasheng, 1993) c g
 Valenzuela vittidorsum (Enderlein, 1907) c g
 Valenzuela wolffhuegelianus (Enderlein, 1906) c g
 Valenzuela wui (Li, Fasheng, 1995) c g
 Valenzuela wuxiaensis (Li, Fasheng, 1997) c g
 Valenzuela wuyishanicus (Li, Fasheng, 1999) c g
 Valenzuela zhejiangicus (Li, Fasheng, 1995) c g

Data sources: i = ITIS, c = Catalogue of Life, g = GBIF, b = Bugguide.net

References

Valenzuela